This is a list of episodes in the Sweet Valley High television series, which starred real-life twins Brittany and Cynthia Daniel as twin sisters Jessica and Elizabeth Wakefield respectively.

Series overview

Episodes

Season 1 (1994–95)
The 22 episode first season of Sweet Valley High debuted in syndication on September 5, 1994, and ended on February 20, 1995. A DVD of the first season was released on March 8, 2005; it is the only season released on DVD to date.

Season 2 (1995–96)
The second season of Sweet Valley High debuted in syndication on September 11, 1995 and ended on March 25, 1996. There were 22 episodes.

Season 3 (1996–97)
Sweet Valley High, Season Three debuted in syndication on August 26, 1996 and ended on February 10, 1997. There were 22 episodes. This is the first season where Jeremy Vincent Garrett and Shirlee Elliot are brought aboard to replace Ryan Bittle and Bridget Flanery in the roles of Todd Wilkins and Lila Fowler. At this point, the characters were titled mostly in the direction of dumb comic-relief.

Season 4 (1997)
Sweet Valley High, Season Four was the final season for the show and the first and only season to be aired on a network. It debuted on UPN on September 15, 1997 and ended on October 14, 1997. There were 22 episodes. No official finale was filmed, as it was believed that the series would be picked up for a fifth season. It introduced Andrea Savage as Renata Vargas as a series regular.

References

External links
 

Lists of American comedy-drama television series episodes
Lists of American teen comedy television series episodes
Lists of American teen drama television series episodes
Lists of American sitcom episodes
Episodes